Edgar Snowden Jr. was an American 19th-century newspaper editor and state legislator in Virginia. He served in the Virginia Senate representing Alexandria, Fairfax and Loudon Counties along with Thomas E. Taylor.

He worked at his father Edgar's Alexandria Gazette newspaper. He was an organizing officer of the Manassa Gap Railroad. He served as an assistant postmaster.

The Union Army used him and others as human shields on rail lines. His paper was pressured by Union authorities not to recognize the legislature in Richmond. Snowden was succeeded in the legislature by Henry Wirtz Thomas.

He was involved with the Alexandria Library Company. Carrol H. Quenzel wrote a biographical sketch about him.

References

Year of birth missing
Year of death missing
19th-century American newspaper editors
Virginia postmasters
Virginia state senators
Editors of Virginia newspapers
Politicians from Alexandria, Virginia
American railroad executives